Waitin' in the Country is the debut album of American country music singer Jason Michael Carroll, released on February 6, 2007 on the Arista Nashville label. The album has produced three singles on the Billboard Hot Country Songs charts in "Alyssa Lies", "Livin' Our Love Song", and "I Can Sleep When I'm Dead", which respectively reached No. 5, No. 6, and No. 21.

The track "Love Won't Let Me" was previously recorded by Victor Sanz, who released it as a single in 2005 from his album Hey Country.

Track listing

Personnel
Compiled from liner notes.
Musicians
 Jason Michael Carroll — lead vocals
 Perry Coleman — background vocals
 J. T. Corenflos — electric guitar
 Michael Daly — steel guitar
 Dan Dugmore — steel guitar
 Larry Frankliln — mandolin, fiddle
 Billy Hawn — percussion
 Wes Hightower — background vocals
 John Hobbs — piano, organ, keyboards
 Jewel — duet vocals on "No Good in Goodbye"
 Greg Morrow — drums
 Herb Pedersen — background vocals
 Alison Prestwood — bass guitar
 Michael Rhodes — bass guitar
 Michael Rojas — piano, organ, keyboards
 John Wesley Ryles — background vocals
 Biff Watson — acoustic guitar
 Jonathan Yudkin — violin, banjo, mandolin, strings, string arrangements
Technical
 Mark Dearnley — recording, mixing
 Don Gehman — production, mixing
 John Hobbs — music director
 Bob Ludwig — mastering

Charts

Weekly charts

Year-end charts

Singles

References

2007 debut albums
Arista Records albums
Jason Michael Carroll albums
Albums produced by Don Gehman